10th razezd is a rural locality (a settlement) in Pervomayskoye Rural Settlement of Mariinsky District, Russia. The population was 10 .

Geography 
10th razezd is located 20 km north of Mariinsk (the district's administrative centre) by road.

References 

Rural localities in Kemerovo Oblast